This article lists the National Liberal Party's election results in UK parliamentary elections.

Summary of general election performance 

Source: F. W. S. Craig, British Electoral Facts, 1885–1975, p.55

Election results

1931 general election

Barrie won in Southampton by taking second place in a two-seat constituency.

By-elections, 1931-1935

1935 general election

Morrison in Combined Scottish Universities, Dodd in Oldham and Barrie in Southampton won seats by taking second place in a two seat constituency.

By-elections, 1935-1945

1945 general election

By-elections, 1945-1950

1950 general election

Richard Nugent is not listed; he was elected as a Conservative, but joined the National Liberal group in Parliament.

By-elections, 1950-1951

1951 general election

Richard Nugent is not listed; he was elected as a Conservative, but joined the National Liberal group in Parliament.

By-elections, 1951-1955

1955 general election

Richard Nugent is not listed; he was elected as a Conservative, but joined the National Liberal group in Parliament.

By-elections, 1955-1959

1959 general election

Richard Nugent is not listed; he was elected as a Conservative, but joined the National Liberal group in Parliament.

By-elections, 1959-1964

1964 general election

John Osborn and Peter Roberts are not listed; they were elected as Conservatives, but joined the National Liberal group in Parliament.

1966 general election

References

Election results by party in the United Kingdom